Sogni mostruosamente proibiti (Monstrously Prohibited Dreams) is a 1982 Italian comedy film directed by Neri Parenti. The film is loosely inspired by The Secret Life of Walter Mitty.

Plot 
Paolo Coniglio is a naive and bumbling writer in a publishing house of comics, bullied by the director and by his future mother-in-law. To escape the dreary daily routine, he finds himself the protagonist of very vivid daydreams in the company of Dalia, the beautiful heroine of the comic books who is responsible of translating.  His visions play with popular heroes of the literature and comics, like Parsifal, Superman and Tarzan. Every time his awakening is increasingly more abrupt, when one day, doing the grocery shopping, he meets a charming blonde girl identical to Dalia that, against his will, involves him in a shady intrigue.

Cast 

Paolo Villaggio as Paolo Coniglio
Janet Agren as  Dalia
Alessandro Haber as   Commissioner Rovere
Antonio Allocca as Brigadier Lamanna
Sophia Lombardo as Marina Saracini
Alida Valli as the mother of Marina
Camillo Milli as the director of the publishing house
Paul Muller as the Hotel Butler
Stefano Antonucci as Franchini 
Chris Avram as  Fonseca
Giulio Farnese as Lawyer Bauer
 Paolo Gozlino as the conductor
Ennio Antonelli as the driver
Mike Bongiorno as  himself
Björn Borg as himself

See also       
 List of Italian films of 1982

References

External links

1982 films
Italian comedy films
1982 comedy films
Films directed by Neri Parenti
Films scored by Bruno Zambrini
Films about writers
Films about comics
1980s Italian films